The Diocese of Zella is a suppressed and titular see of the Roman Catholic Church.
 The diocese of Zella, is located in today's Tunisia.

During the Roman Empire the Diocese was centered on a Roman town of the Roman province of Byzacena.
During late antiquity the city had both a Donatist and Catholic congregation. These two both sent bishops to the Conference of Carthage of 411.

Today Zella survives as a titular bishopric and the current archbishop, personal title, is Angelo Acerbi, who was already the prelate of the Order of Malta's military sovereign.

Known bishops
Donaziano † (fl411) 
Natalico † (fl 411) (Donatist bishop)
Franz Brazys (1964–1967)
Cesare Zacchi (1967–1974)
Angelo Acerbi (1974)

References

Catholic Church in Tunisia
Archaeological sites in Tunisia
Roman towns and cities in Tunisia
Lost cities and towns
Catholic titular sees in Africa
Ancient Berber cities
Roman towns and cities in Africa (Roman province)
Cities in Tunisia